The 1931 Workers' Winter Olympiad was the third edition of International Workers' Olympiads and the second Winter Olympiad. The games were held from February 5 to February 8 at the Austrian town of Mürzzuschlag.

Nordic skiing

Men's 15 km cross-country skiing

Men's 30 km cross-country skiing 
Race cancelled.

Men's 3 km steeplechase skiing

Men's 10 km downhill cross-country skiing

Women's 4 km cross-country skiing

Women's 6 km cross-country skiing

Men's 10 km team skiing

Men's Nordic combined

Men's ski jumping

Speed skating

Men's 500 m

Men's 1500 m

Men's 5000 m

Men's 10000 m

Figure skating

Men's singles

Ladies' singles

Pair skating

Men's ice hockey

Country ranking 
Participating nations are ranked by positions, since no medals were awarded at the Workers' Olympiads.

Sources 
Väinö Koivula: "TUL Vuosikirja 1931" (Finnish Workers' Sports Federation Yearbook 1931).

International Workers' Olympiads
1931 in multi-sport events
International sports competitions hosted by Austria
Winter multi-sport events in Austria
February 1931 sports events
1931 in Austrian sport